In enzymology, a 5-amino-6-(5-phosphoribosylamino)uracil reductase is an enzyme that catalyzes the chemical reaction

5-amino-6-(5-phosphoribitylamino)uracil + NADP+  5-amino-6-(5-phosphoribosylamino)uracil + NADPH + H+

Thus, the two substrates of this enzyme are 5-amino-6-(5-phosphoribitylamino)uracil and NADP+, whereas its 3 products are 5-amino-6-(5-phosphoribosylamino)uracil, NADPH, and H+.

This enzyme belongs to the family of oxidoreductases, specifically those acting on the CH-OH group of donor with NAD+ or NADP+ as acceptor. The systematic name of this enzyme class is 5-amino-6-(5-phosphoribitylamino)uracil:NADP+ 1'-oxidoreductase. This enzyme is also called aminodioxyphosphoribosylaminopyrimidine reductase. This enzyme participates in riboflavin metabolism.

Structural studies

References

 

EC 1.1.1
NADPH-dependent enzymes
Enzymes of known structure